Michał Kokoszanek (born 27 June 1977) is a Polish former professional footballer who played as a goalkeeper.

Career

Lech Poznań 
Kokoszanek started his career with Polish top flight side Lech Poznań, where he made 52 appearances and scored 0 goals. On 25 October 1997, Kokoszanek debuted for Lech Poznań in a 3–2 defeat to Stomil Olsztyn. On 15 August 1999, Kokoszanek let in a shot from 35 to 45 meters between his legs during a 1–1 draw with Legia Warszawa. After that, fans sang, "Kokoszanek, more goals; Kokoszanek - extra pyra; Kokoszanek, goal hunter; Koko, Koko score a goal" whenever he played.

Late career 
In 2000, Kokoszanek signed for Huragan Pobiedziska in the Polish third division. Before the 2002 season, he signed for Faroese club B68.

References

External links
 

1977 births
Living people
Footballers from Poznań
Polish footballers
Association football goalkeepers
Lech Poznań players
B68 Toftir players
Górnik Konin players
Ekstraklasa players
Faroe Islands Premier League players
Polish expatriate footballers
Polish expatriate sportspeople in the Faroe Islands
Expatriate footballers in the Faroe Islands